Mary Halford may refer to:

 Mary Halford (tennis) (1915—2009), British tennis player
 Mary Halford, birth name of British artist Mary Davis

See also
Mary Holford